Felchville is a populated place in Natick, Middlesex County, Massachusetts, in the United States.

History
A factory was established at Felchville in the 1850s by the Felch brothers.

References

Natick, Massachusetts
Villages in Massachusetts
Villages in Middlesex County, Massachusetts